Crawl is a 2019 American natural horror film directed by Alexandre Aja, written by brothers Michael and Shawn Rasmussen, and produced by Sam Raimi. It stars Kaya Scodelario and Barry Pepper as a daughter and father who, along with their dog, find themselves trapped in the crawl space of their home and preyed upon by alligators during a Category 5 hurricane in Florida.

Aja rewrote the original spec script from the Rasmussen brothers to expand the length of the story and its characters. The film was officially announced by the media in May 2018, and production started in Serbia in August with cinematographer Maxime Alexandre. The film was primarily shot within a warehouse facility located in the Port of Belgrade and wrapped shooting after 41 days in September. During post-production, the film score was composed by Max Aruj and Steffen Thum, and visual effects such as the alligators were produced by Rodeo FX. It took three months to complete the visual effects.

Distributed by Paramount Pictures, Crawl opted out of conventional film screenings for critics and premiered in the United States on July 12, 2019. With an "R" rating from the Motion Picture Association, the film grossed $91.5 million against a $13–15 million production budget. It was met with generally positive reviews for its direction, pacing, and visual effects, and earned a nomination for Best Wide Release at the 2020 Fangoria Chainsaw Awards. In April 2021, after growing speculation, Aja confirmed a sequel was in development.

Plot

University of Florida swimmer Haley Keller receives a call from her sister Beth, who informs her that Category 5 Hurricane Wendy is on its way to Florida and advises her to get out of the state. Concerned for the safety of her estranged father Dave, Haley goes to check on him at his condo but finds it empty. She goes against the instructions of Beth's ex-boyfriend Wayne, a member of the Florida Police Department, by deciding to check out their old family home in Coral Lake, a location at risk of flooding.

Haley descends into the house's crawl space with the help of the family dog, Sugar, and finds her father unconscious. Suddenly, her main exit is cut off by several large American alligators. As the house begins to flood, Haley attempts to navigate around them to retrieve her phone but is ambushed by two alligators that destroy the phone and injure her leg. She notices three people looting a nearby gas station, but her efforts to draw their attention do not work, and she watches in despair as they are devoured by alligators.

Wayne and his partner Pete arrive at the old house in search of Haley and her father. While Wayne heads into the house to look for them, Pete is ambushed and ripped apart by a swarm of alligators. Wayne locates them as they warn him of the dangers in the crawl space before being pulled into the crawl space by an alligator and devoured underwater. In a last-ditch effort to escape, Haley swims to a storm drain, where she discovers the alligators have made their nest and laid eggs.

Haley successfully kills an alligator using a gun she retrieves from Wayne's body, shooting down the alligator's throat while her arm is inside of it. She then swims out into the flooded street through the storm drain and enters the house to crowbar the living room floor open, saving Dave from drowning. Haley, Dave, and Sugar carefully make their way onto a boat outside as the eye of the hurricane moves over the neighborhood. The floodwaters break the nearby levees, crashing them back into the house.

As Dave and Sugar make their way up the stairs, Dave loses his right arm when he is attacked by an alligator. Haley navigates around the kitchen and uses a discarded police radio to broadcast a distress signal to authorities. She also manages to trap an alligator in the house bathroom and attempts to flag down a rescue helicopter from an upstairs bedroom. However, Haley is attacked by another alligator that tries to perform a death roll. While Dave and Sugar escape to the attic, Haley stabs the alligator in the eye with a flare and all three reunite on the roof. After narrowly avoiding another alligator, Haley lights a flare and flags down the rescue helicopter as Dave proudly watches.

Cast

 Kaya Scodelario as Haley Keller
 Barry Pepper as Dave Keller
 Morfydd Clark as Beth Keller
 Ross Anderson as Wayne Taylor
 Jose Palma as Pete
 George Somner as Marv
 Anson Boon as Stan
 Ami Metcalf as Lee
 Colin McFarlane as the Governor
 Cso-Cso as Sugar, Dave's dog

Production

Development

Brothers Michael and Shawn Rasmussen wrote the spec script for the film, and producer Craig Flores gave it to French filmmaker Alexandre Aja in 2017. Aja was initially intrigued by the logline itself, and departed from a James Wan–directed project to read the screenplay. However, he became disappointed with the story's actual length, which took place in one location, the crawl space, and followed the characters as they were antagonized by a single alligator, with a second alligator appearing in the third act. Aja rewrote the script over the course of a year to introduce new locations and expand the characters. He worked with Flores and Dana Stevens to improve the screenplay and ultimately decided to make Haley Keller a skilled swimmer and her father Dave her former coach to make their journey in the film realistic.

The scene where Haley goes against the instructions of several people to retrieve her father was influenced by a scene in Alfred Hitchcock's The Birds (1963). It was added in to highlight her determination and give audiences the "[feeling] that something is coming and building up" in an "old school" fashion. Aja wanted to put each character in the worst-case scenario possible so he rewrote the screenplay as a "home invasion movie" where the hurricane was an antagonist. He did extensive research on hurricanes and alligators, and looked through "hundreds of hours" of real-world footage to find examples of both topics in their "ferocious" and "powerful" nature. The design of the alligators were based on a stuffed Mississippi alligator located at the American Museum of Natural History and a sheltered alligator in Miami nicknamed "Godzilla".

On May 1, 2018, Paramount Pictures announced it had acquired the rights to the film, and described the antagonists as the "most savage and feared predators" in Florida. Aja, whose previous credits at the time included the horror films Piranha 3D (2010) and Horns (2013), came on board to direct the thriller produced by Flores and Sam Raimi. The project had previously been in development through Lakeshore Entertainment and Annapurna Pictures before moving to Paramount to benefit from the success of A Quiet Place (2018), another low-budget horror film from the studio. Aja listed the one-location styles of Alien (1979) and Cujo (1983), and the setting in Raimi's The Evil Dead (1981) as inspirations for the film. With Jaws (1975) serving as "the blueprint", Aja wanted the film to feel similar to riding a rollercoaster: suspenseful. Paramount agreed to keep the runtime short, and ultimately decided on a mere 87 minutes. Aja went against the advice of multiple executives to introduce the alligators early on in the film, as he believed this would be unexpected to the general audience. One idea considered for the ending would have seen the main characters get eaten by an alligator. Aja also said there were several discussions on "whether the dog would live or not"; alternate scenarios involved an alligator biting the dog's tail off, the main characters feeding the dog to the alligators to escape their home, and the dog sacrificing itself to save its owners. The happy ending was picked to evoke a positive response from audiences.

Casting
Kaya Scodelario entered negotiations to star in May 2018. Paramount executive Wyck Godfrey gave her the chance to join the film in a leading role without having to audition. Accepting the part, she said she picked the film based on "the material and the character, and if it's going to empower me or teach me or test me." To physically prepare for the role, Scodelario was trained to swim by coaches from England and Serbia, including a former Olympian, who helped her for six to seven weeks at the London Aquatics Centre. Her training progressed from her having to swim in a kiddie pool with floaties to swimming at a "good speed and quite good stamina". Barry Pepper, having previously worked with Scodelario in 2015 on Maze Runner: The Scorch Trials, was added to the cast in June 2018. He also underwent months of training to improve his swimming, and said he enjoyed the idea of working on a film about a father-and-daughter relationship living in Florida.

Design and filming
Crawl is the first Paramount film to be shot in the country of Serbia. Principal photography began in August 2018 and concluded in September after 41 days. Maxime Alexandre was the cinematographer. The majority of filming took place in the city of Belgrade, particularly on a set located in a warehouse facility for shipping containers in the Port of Belgrade. On July 30, 2018, days before production officially began, the set was visited by Serbian President Aleksandar Vučić and United States Ambassador to Serbia Kyle Randolph Scott. Vučić said he was "extremely glad" of the studio's decision to film in the country.

Using Arri Alexa cameras, including an Alexa SXT and an Alexa Mini, the film was shot with Leica Summilux-C lenses and Alura lightweight zooms on a Steadicam and a Technocrane. Within the facility, three soundstages were equipped, "the largest one for the exterior house and neighborhood, another for the house exterior and interiors, first and second floor—also used for underwater filming—and a third stage for the basement and roof scenes". In an interview, Pepper mentioned that the warehouses used were the size of football fields and that the houses, gas stations, and trees were built on set.

Alan Gilmore was the film's production designer. To make the usage of water realistic, he watched several photo documentaries from New Orleans to research natural disasters and the effects a hurricane could have on houses without sustainable protection to make sure "it looks exactly right and causes the right damage and the right effects". For the main location, a house was constructed inside one of the warehouses and the production crew added a water tank they were able to fill to flood the house as filming progressed.

Overall, seven water tanks were built, of which two were filled simply to carry water, four were used for each section of the house, and a larger three-meter tall 60-meter by 80-meter tank was used for the neighborhood. According to the Serbia Film Commission, most of the film was shot after the house was flooded with the main water tanks, with 5 million liters of water being used on a daily basis. Scodelario found the shoot "the most physically demanding" of her career: "I was broken at the end of every day. We were shooting 16- to 18-hour days. I was on set all day, every day. I lost about 12 pounds shooting the movie, but I gained some of it in muscle, which I was quite impressed with. I broke a finger; I came home every day bruised, bloodied and cut open." She has spoken of how she "beefed up" her character as much as she could, eschewing makeup and playing most of the film in her bare feet, explaining: "I fought to have her barefoot [...] I didn't want protection on my feet. As a girl who's a swimmer, she's going to wear flip-flops and once she has to crawl around, she's going to kick them off." Additional filming took place in the United States, specifically around Tampa Bay in Tierra Verde, Lake Maggiore in St. Petersburg, and Thonotosassa, where exterior scenes and B-roll footage was shot. Scenes involving characters driving were shot in front of green screens, with some footage being filmed with stuntmen while actors were still in Belgrade.

Practical alligators, including the baby alligators, were created for a mere four to five takes in the film. To simulate the CGI alligators, scenes varied between Serbian stuntmen wearing green spandex suits, divers recreating alligator movements underwater, the director holding a pole attached to a pillow wrapped in green fabric, and actors reacting to fake alligator heads on sticks. Most of the weather elements seen in the film, including the wind and the rain, were provided on-set during filming, while the setting, trees, and hurricane itself were computer-generated. After filming concluded, the visual effects were handled during post-production for three months by Rodeo FX, supervised by Thomas Montminy Brodeur and Keith Kolder, who created a total 244 shots for the film.

Music

The film score was produced by Lorne Balfe and composed by Max Aruj and Steffen Thum. Aja said the initial composer left due to creative differences, so Aruj and Thum had less than a month to compose the score; Paramount reassured them the film would not be delayed after Aja expressed his concerns. Aruj and Thum had collaborated on multiple projects while working under Remote Control Productions, including on the Netflix film iBoy (2017). The score was recorded at Synchron Stage Vienna. It was released on July 12, 2019, by Paramount Music, and on Vinyl LP by Rusted Wave on March 6, 2020.

Marketing
The marketing campaign from Paramount Pictures for Crawl began on April 4, 2019, when initial footage was shown at CinemaCon. While /Film said the footage made the premise of the film feel similar to a "wacky sounding horror movie", Bloody Disgusting compared it to Burning Bright (2010), and Screen Rant wrote that they believed the film would have a "claustrophobic effect" on moviegoers. Early reactions compared the film to 47 Meters Down (2017) and Jaws.

On May 2, 2019, an official trailer for the feature film was released alongside the first theatrical release poster; the second poster was released two weeks later. With Chris Evangelista from /Film writing that it was "something I very much want to see", the footage from the trailer was compared to Deep Blue Sea (1999), Open Water (2003), Rogue (2007), Bait 3D (2012), and The Shallows (2016). From Syfy Wire, Josh Weiss compared the premise to the Florida Man internet meme and said that based on the trailer, Crawl would be able to compete with the Lake Placid film series, a franchise centered on crocodile horror films. Screen Rant journalist Cooper Hood wrote that the trailer "effectively conveys the thrills and sense of dread that it wants", and compared it to Don't Breathe (2016). Within a few hours of release, the trailer was watched by over a million viewers, which Entertainment Weekly credited to the "viral marketing" from Paramount, who had models, influencers, and celebrities, including several from Jersey Shore, Floribama Shore, and Siesta Key, share content from the film. In July 2019, Comic Book Resources went on to say the trailer "gave away the best scenes" without "kill[ing] any of the suspense". That same month, several clips and film stills were released; Brad Miska from Bloody Disgusting recommended viewers to avoid watching them before seeing the film.

In a marketing summary from Deadline Hollywood, Anthony D'Alessandro analyzed the reason Crawl, alongside Stuber, failed to generate the same buzz created by The Meg in 2018 and that year's Spider-Man: Far From Home and Toy Story 4. In his report, the reasoning was credited to the release of a single trailer, the appearance of digital advertisements only weeks before the film's release, and the social media campaign gaining 57 million views, below the average 82 million for horror films. Additionally, it was revealed that Paramount had used $25 million for television commercials aired on at least twenty-seven networks.

Release

Theatrical
Weeks prior to its release, the Crawl marketing crew opted out of conventional film screenings for critics and only had one during its campaign for promotional purposes. Its release to positive reviews named it "one of [the] most pleasant (and most terrifying) surprises" of 2019, and the "best 'not screened for film critics' movie in years".

In January 2019, Crawl was given a theatrical release date for later that year on August 23, to compete against the premieres of Angel Has Fallen and Overcomer. In March, the premiere date for the film was brought forward to July 12, 2019, this time to compete against The Farewell and Stuber. After the Motion Picture Association gave Crawl an "R" rating for "Bloody creature violence, and brief language," it was announced that the film would also be released in 4DX auditoriums.

Home media
Paramount Home Entertainment released Crawl via digital download on September 24, 2019, with a Blu-ray, DVD, and video on demand physical release on October 15. Special features, lasting 45 minutes, include a motion comic of an alternate opening scene involving a family being eaten by alligators, deleted and extended scenes, a compilation of scenes titled "Alligator Attacks", behind-the-scenes footage and featurettes, and interviews with the cast and crew.

Reception

Box office
Crawl grossed $39 million in the United States and Canada, and $55.5 million in other territories, for a worldwide total of $91.5 million against a production budget of $13–15 million. Marketed as a counterprogramming option for moviegoers, the film's box office performance was seen as a commercial success.

The film premiered in the United States and Canada on July 12, in 3,170 theaters, where initial estimates predicted the feature would open with $10–14 million. In its four-day opening weekend, Crawl placed third at the box office and earned $12 million, following its earnings of $4.4 million on Friday, including $1 million from Thursday night previews, $4.3 million on Saturday, and $3.4 million on Sunday. Audiences were 64% above the age of 25, 60% between the ages of 18–34, and 51% male. Outside of the two countries, the film opened in theaters in 20 foreign markets, making $4.8 million in its first week, for a $16.8 million opening weekend worldwide.

In its second weekend in the United States and Canada, Crawl placed fourth at the box office, having fallen behind due to the release of The Lion King, and grossed $6 million for a $24 million total domestically after 10 days in release. That same week, the film made $2.7 million in 21 foreign markets. In its third weekend, Crawl moved to fifth place, due to the release of Once Upon a Time in Hollywood, and made $4 million. Outside of the two countries, the film grossed $3.4 million, for a $45 million total worldwide. In its fourth weekend, the film reached $53 million worldwide as eighth at the box office, before falling below the top ten list for the rest of its theatrical release.

Critical response
 The site's critical consensus reads, "An action-packed creature feature that's fast, terrifying, and benefits greatly from a completely game Kaya Scodelario, Crawl is a fun throw-back with just enough self-awareness to work."  Audiences polled by CinemaScore during its opening weekend gave the film an average grade of "B" on an A+ to F scale, while PostTrak reported audience members gave it an average rating of 2.5 out of 5 stars, with 46% saying they would definitely recommend it.
Contemporary reviews of the film praised its suspense, brisk pacing, and visual presentation of its main antagonists. In a comparison with 2019's Godzilla: King of the Monsters, Daniel Menegaz from Entertainment Weekly shared positive feedback to Crawls self-awareness, low runtime, and overall execution of its "simple" premise. Filmmaker Quentin Tarantino called it one of his favorite films of 2019.

Giving it a "B−", A.A. Dowd from The A.V. Club lauded the film for extensively using its "R" rating to increase its usage of gore. In his three-star and a half review for Rolling Stone, David Fear applauded the performances of the leads and Aja's directing. While Slates Keith Phipps praised the action sequences and found its summer release to be adequate, Tomris Laffly from RogerEbert.com wrote that the film was engaging enough to please an audience. From the Chicago Tribune, Michael Phillips said that he "liked it pretty well" as a "pleasantly unpleasant" film. Furthermore, Vultures Angelica Jade Bastién gave an entirely positive review, lending remarks to Scodelario's acting, Alexandre's cinematography, and premise that "more than delivers" as a "great example of a simple story exceedingly well-told".

Despite the generally positive reviews, several critics gave Crawl a mixed review. Writing for The New York Times, Jeannette Catsoulis criticized the film's screenplay while calling it an efficient popcorn movie. From The New Yorker, Richard Brody gave positive remarks to the jumpscares but found the visual effects to be unintentionally humorous. With Varietys Owen Gleiberman pillorying the realism of Haley's survival, IndieWire referred to the feature as an entertaining and suspenseful B movie, giving it a "C+". Meanwhile, The Guardian Simran Hans and Clarisse Loughrey from The Independent both gave the film two stars out of five; the latter summarized it by writing that the film had "its bloody moments, with plenty of lingering shots of gaping wounds and protruding bones [but] just doesn't seem as gleeful in its carnage as the situation calls for".

Various journalists analyzed the presence of climate change in the film. From GQ, Noah Berlatsky wrote that the hurricane was the actual antagonist, opining that Crawl was set in an apocalyptic world where climate change was not resolved. Furthermore, Bustle magazine criticized the feature for having the hurricane "act as backdrop and excuse for something ludicrous as a giant alligator". Miles Howard, from Vice, found that Crawl was marketed to create "climate anxiety" in audiences with experiences with natural disasters such as Hurricane Katrina, writing that the film presented the hurricane as the representation of an "impending ecological collapse". Writing for Thrillist, Emma Stefansky said the film was thrilling enough to scare viewers but stated that "it's the looming menace of climate change and its consequences that ought to scare us the most". In November 2019, The Hill ranked Crawl as one of the top ten films of the year tackling climate change in an effective manner.

Accolades
At the 2020 Fangoria Chainsaw Awards, Crawl received a nomination for Best Wide Release. The film also earned a pair of nominations for Best Horror Film from the Hollywood Critics Association and IGN Awards, losing both to Us. At the 13th Houston Film Critics Society Awards, the feature received a nomination for Best Stunt Coordination Team, but lost to John Wick: Chapter 3 – Parabellum. The National Film & TV Awards nominated the film for Best Actress (Kaya Scodelario) and Best Producer (Alexandre Aja, Craig Flores, and Sam Raimi), losing both to Jennifer Lopez from Hustlers and Will Ferrell from Booksmart, respectively.

Possible sequel
In July 2019, Aja said a sequel to the film would focus on different characters in a different story. In October, he mentioned that the production crew had been developing "a few stories" for a future installment. Following its positive reception, Aja said he was "sure the question of a sequel [was] going to come up". Two years later, in April 2021, Aja revealed that a screenplay was, in fact, being written for a potential sequel, but that he could not disclose any more information.

See also
 Burning Bright (2010), film about two siblings trapped at home with a tiger during a hurricane

References

External links
 
 

2010s American films
2010s English-language films
2019 horror films
American natural horror films
American survival films
Films about father–daughter relationships
Films about crocodilians
Films about hurricanes
Films about tropical cyclones
Films directed by Alexandre Aja
Films produced by Sam Raimi
Films set in Florida
Films shot in Belgrade
Films shot in Florida
Flood films
Paramount Pictures films
Films set in basement